The Ranfurly Shield, colloquially known as the Log o' Wood, is perhaps the most prestigious trophy in New Zealand's domestic rugby union competition. First played for in 1904, the Ranfurly Shield is based on a challenge system, rather than a league or knockout competition as with most football trophies. The holding union must defend the Shield in challenge matches, and if a challenger defeats them, they become the new holder of the Shield.

Holders
Six different unions held the Ranfurly Shield between 1930 and 1939.

Fixtures

1930

1931

1932

1933

1934

1935

1936

1937

1938

1939

References

External links 
 Results at Scrum.co.nz

1930-39
1930 in New Zealand rugby union
1931 in New Zealand rugby union
1932 in New Zealand rugby union
1933 in New Zealand rugby union
1934 in New Zealand rugby union
1935 in New Zealand rugby union
1936 in New Zealand rugby union
1937 in New Zealand rugby union
1938 in New Zealand rugby union
1939 in New Zealand rugby union